Igor Gennadyevich Gordin (born May 6, 1965) is a Soviet and Russian actor of theater and cinema. Honored Artist of the Russian Federation (2004). Laureate of the Golden Mask (2011).

Biography 
Gordin was born in Leningrad, Russian SFSR, Soviet Union  (now Saint Petersburg, Russia).

Since the eighth grade of secondary school secretly from his parents he played at the Theater of Youth Creativity (TYUT) at the Leningrad Palace of Pioneers.

He graduated from the Peter the Great St. Petersburg Polytechnic University, specializing in nuclear physics, but did not quit the scene. I went to Moscow to get an acting education.

In 1993 he graduated from the acting department of the Russian Institute of Theatrical Art – GITIS (course of Irina Sudakova).

After graduation, GITIS worked a theatrical season at the Moscow State Academic Sovremennik Theatre.

In 1994, he moved to the main roles in the Moscow Theater of Young Spectators, where he currently works.

Personal life 
Gordin is married to actress and television host Yuliya Menshova, with whom he has two children: Andrey Gordin (born 1997) and Taisia Gordina (born 2003).

Selected filmography 
 Children of the Arbat (2004) as Igor Vladimirovich
 Heavenly Court (2014) as Alex
 Coach (2018) as President of FC Spartak Moscow
 Gold Diggers (2019) as Boris Markovich
 Palmira  (2022) as Major general
 Peter I: The Last Tsar and the First Emperor (2022) as Menshikov

References

External links

1965 births
Living people
Male actors from Saint Petersburg
Russian male film actors
Russian male television actors
Russian male stage actors
Honored Artists of the Russian Federation
Peter the Great St. Petersburg Polytechnic University alumni
Russian Academy of Theatre Arts alumni
20th-century Russian male actors
21st-century Russian male actors